The 1994–95 Slovak Extraliga season was the second season of the Slovak Extraliga, the top level of ice hockey in Slovakia. 10 teams participated in the league, and HC Kosice won the championship.

Standings

Playoffs

Quarterfinals 
 Dukla Trenčín - Spartak Dubnica nad Váhom 3:0 (11:3,3:2,4:2)
 HC Košice - ZPA Prešov 3:0 (10:1,4:3,6:1)
 Slovan Bratislava - Martimex ZŤS Martin 3:0 (5:1,5:2,2:0)
 ŠKP PS Poprad - HK 32 Liptovský Mikuláš 3:0 (8:5,4:1,4:3)

Semifinals 
 Dukla Trenčín - ŠKP PS Poprad 3:0 (9:5,5:3,5:3)
 HC Košice - Slovan Bratislava 3:0 (11:1,8:1,3:1)

3rd place 
 Slovan Bratislava - ŠKP PS Poprad 2:1 (4:3,5:6,5:2)

Final 
 Dukla Trenčín - HC Košice 0:3 (2:4,3:5,1:7)

External links
 Slovak Ice Hockey Federation

Slovak Extraliga seasons
Slovak
Extra